Alice Ludes (née Sizer; December 20, 1912 – February 12, 2017) was an American singer.

Biography
Ludes was born on December 20, 1912, in Tacoma, Washington, as Alice Sizer, one of eight children born to E.R. and Minnie Sizer. She  entered show business after graduating from high school. Along with two other women, she formed a band called The Williams Sisters. The group relocated to San Francisco after signing a contract with NBC.

In 1939, she married radio announcer and technician Ed Ludes.

She later joined a new band called the Music Maids in Los Angeles. They performed on Bing Crosby's radio program and in several movies, including Broadway Melody of 1940, Hit Parade of 1943 and Meet Me in St. Louis. During her professional career, she performed with notable singers such as Judy Garland.

Ed Ludes died in 1987. Alice Ludes was living in Ventura, California (and still playing piano) at the time of her 102nd birthday in December 2014. She turned 104 years old on December 20, 2016.

Death
Alice Ludes died on February 12, 2017, aged 104.

References

External links

1912 births
2017 deaths
American centenarians
People from Ventura, California
Musicians from Tacoma, Washington
Musicians from Ventura County, California
Singers from Tacoma, Washington
Singers from California
20th-century American singers
20th-century American women singers
21st-century American women singers
Women centenarians
21st-century American singers